Termitomyces is a genus of basidiomycete fungi belonging to the family Lyophyllaceae. There are 30-40 species in the genus, all of which are completely dependent on termites to survive. They are the food source for a subfamily of termites, the Macrotermitinae, who enjoy an obligate symbiosis with the genus similar to that between Atta ants and Attamyces mushrooms. Despite this relationship, spore transfer is still accomplished mainly by shedding from mushrooms, which protrude from the termite mounds.

Characteristics
These mushrooms are edible for most people, and the larger species are a popular wild food where they occur. They include the largest edible mushroom in the world, Termitomyces titanicus of West Africa and Zambia, whose cap reaches 1 metre (3.28ft) in diameter. These fungi grow on 'combs' which are formed from the termites' excreta, dominated by tough woody fragments. Termitomyces was described by Roger Heim in 1942.

From 1955 to 1969 Arthur French  worked in Uganda (as a hobby) on the subject of fungi and termites. Some scientific literature about these fungal species existed previously, but these texts failed to adequately discuss the relationship between termites and their fungal symbiotes, while the various edible varieties were merely termed "termite mushrooms."  French conducted some investigations with the help of the elderly Baganda women who gathered termite mushrooms, and published his findings.

Culinary use 
This genus is a popular seasonal delicacy in the Indian state of Goa. For about two weeks at the beginning of August every year, clusters of villagers dot the Goan roadside hawking the handpicked mushrooms. A spicy gravy known as "Tonak" is a popular method of preparation. Since Termitomyces mushrooms are difficult to mass produce, they command a high price.

Species
, Species Fungorum accepted 47 species of Termitomyces.

 Termitomyces albidus (Singer) L.D. Gómez (1995)
 Termitomyces aurantiacus (R. Heim) R. Heim (1977)
 Termitomyces biyi Otieno (1966)
 Termitomyces bulborhizus T.Z. Wei, Y.J. Yao, Bo Wang & Pegler (2004)
 Termitomyces citriophyllus R. Heim (1942)
 Termitomyces clypeatus R. Heim (1951)
 Termitomyces congolensis (Beeli) Singer (1948)
 Termitomyces dominicalensis L.D. Gómez (1995)
 Termitomyces entolomoides R. Heim (1951)
 Termitomyces epipolius (Singer) L.D. Gómez (1995)
 Termitomyces eurrhizus (Berk.) R. Heim (1942)
 Termitomyces floccosus S.M. Tang, Raspé & S.H. Li (2020)
 Termitomyces fragilis L. Ye, Karun, J.C. Xu, K.D. Hyde & Mortimer (2019)
 Termitomyces fuliginosus R. Heim (1942)
 Termitomyces globulus R. Heim & Gooss.-Font. (1951)
 Termitomyces griseiumbo Mossebo (2003)
 Termitomyces heimii Natarajan (1979)
 Termitomyces indicus Natarajan (1976)
 Termitomyces infundibuliformis Mossebo (2012)
 Termitomyces intermedius Har. Takah. & Taneyama (2016)
 Termitomyces lanatus R. Heim (1977)
 Termitomyces le-testui testui (Pat.) R. Heim (1942)
 Termitomyces magoyensis Otieno (1966)
 Termitomyces mammiformis R. Heim (1942)
 Termitomyces mboudaeinus Mossebo (2003)
 Termitomyces medius R. Heim & Grassé (1951)
 Termitomyces meipengianus (M. Zang & D.Z. Zhang) P.M. Kirk (2014)
 Termitomyces microcarpus (Berk. & Broome) R. Heim (1942)
 Termitomyces narobiensis Otieno (1966)
 Termitomyces perforans R. Heim (1977)
 Termitomyces poliomphax (Singer) L.D. Gómez (1995)
 Termitomyces rabuorii Otieno (1966)
 Termitomyces radicatus Natarajan (1977)
 Termitomyces reticulatus Van der Westh. & Eicker (1990)
 Termitomyces robustus (Beeli) R. Heim (1951)
 Termitomyces sagittiformis (Kalchbr. & Cooke) D.A. Reid (1975)
 Termitomyces schimperi (Pat.) R. Heim (1942)
 Termitomyces singidensis Saarim. & Härk. (1994)
 Termitomyces songolarum (Courtec.) Furneaux (2020)
 Termitomyces spiniformis R. Heim (1977)
 Termitomyces striatus (Beeli) R. Heim (1942)
 Termitomyces subclypeatus Mossebo (2003)
 Termitomyces subumkowaan Mossebo (2003)
 Termitomyces titanicus Pegler & Piearce (1980)
 Termitomyces tylerianus Otieno (1966)
 Termitomyces umkowaan (Cooke & Massee) D.A. Reid (1975)
 Termitomyces upsilocystidiatus S.M. Tang, Raspé & K.D. Hyde (2020)

Other termite-associating fungi that may be confused with Termitomyces
 Inedible fruiting bodies of the genus Podaxis, which may also grow from termitaria.  Podaxis species can be easily distinguished from those of Termitomyces in that Podaxis fruiting bodies resemble a "stalked puffball," or an unopened shaggy mane, while those of Termitomyces resemble a stereotypical mushroom or toadstool.
 In China, fruiting bodies of the unrelated, but edible Macrolepiota albuminosa may also grow from termitaria.  M. albuminosa was once incorrectly placed within this genus as "Termitomyces albuminosa".

References

See Tobias Frøslev's Termitomyces page 
And an academic review of the relationship in Patterns of interaction specificity of fungus-growing termites and Termitomyces symbionts in South Africa  Aanenet DK al BMC Evol Biol. 2007; 7: 115.

External links
Image of a Termitomyces
UN FAO report about Wild edible fungi

Lyophyllaceae
Agaricales genera